The  is an automobile engine museum run by Nissan Motor Company. The museum is located at the first floor of the guest hall in Yokohama auto plant, Kanagawa-ku, Yokohama, Japan.

Overview 
The building of the museum was built in 1934 in Kanagawa-ku, Yokohama, Kanagawa Prefecture. As the first auto plant of Nissan Motors in Yokohama, the building has also been worked as the headquarters of the company until 1968, when the headquarters was moved to Ginza, Tokyo.

The museum exhibits the latest model car and a memorial car of Nissan brand, 28 Nissan's auto engines, history of Yokohama auto plant and equipments for environmental techniques.

See also 
Nissan
Datsun
Infiniti

References

External links 
 Nissan Engine Museum 
 Google Virtual Gallery Tour

Nissan
Museums in Yokohama
Automobile museums in Japan